The 2000 NCAA Division I women's volleyball tournament began on November 30, 2000 with 64 teams and ended December 16 when Nebraska defeated Wisconsin 3 games to 2 in Richmond, Virginia for the program's second NCAA title. 

Nebraska became the second team in NCAA history to finish the season undefeated, as they joined Long Beach State from 1998 to pull off the feat. The win gave John Cook his first national title in just his first year as Nebraska's head coach. Wisconsin, for whom Cook was the previous head coach, made the program's first Final Four appearance. 

This was the last season that the NCAA used side out scoring, switching to rally scoring in 2001.

Records

For the third straight year, the tournament field remained fixed at 64 teams. The Big Ten, Big 12, and Pac-10 tied for the most bids in the 2000 NCAA Tournament with six bids each. The top six seeds each came from different conferences, the only such instance of this in the 64-team era. Nebraska went undefeated en route to a national championship, joining 1998 Long Beach State and later teams 2003 USC and 2008-09 Penn State as undefeated national champions.

Central Regional (Lincoln)

West Regional (Honolulu)

Pacific Regional (Los Angeles)

Mideast Regional (Madison)

Final Four – Richmond Coliseum, Richmond, VA

National Semifinals

Nebraska vs. Hawaii
Aided by 23 team blocks, top seeded Nebraska cruised past Hawaii in four sets. Nebraska junior Jenny Kropp had 16 kills to lead the way for the Huskers. Sophomore outside hitter Lily Kahumoku led Hawaii with 18 kills, while freshman Kim Willoughby had 15.

Wisconsin vs. Southern California
Appearing in  the program's first ever Final Four, Wisconsin swept USC to earn a spot in the title match against Nebraska.

National Championship: Nebraska vs. Wisconsin 

Nebraska jumped on top to start out the match, with a block giving NU the first game, 15-9. In the second game, Wisconsin raced out to the 13-4 lead before winning, 15-9, to tie the match at one game a piece.

Leading 5-4 in the third game, Wisconsin pulled away by winning eight straight points to go up 13-4. Nebraska responded with three straight points of their own to cut the lead to 13-7, before two Badger kills ended the game, 15-7, to put the Badgers up 2-1 on the undefeated Huskers.

Nebraska responded strongly in set 4, crushing the Badgers, 15-2, to force a fifth game. In the decisive fifth game, Nebraska raced out to the 4-0 lead. Nebraska continued to roll, going up 11-5. Nebraska earned championship point on a kill, before Laura Pilakowski crushed her 23rd kill of the match to seal the victory.

The national title capped a season in which the Huskers achieved much success. The Huskers became just the second team in NCAA history to finish the season undefeated with a national title, joining the 1998 Long Beach State squad. Nebraska, ranked No. 1 in the AVCA/USA Today Coaches poll for 14 straight weeks, swept 26 of its 33 opponents in 2000. It was Nebraska head coach John Cook's first season with the program. Cook was previously the head coach at Wisconsin.

NCAA Tournament records

There are three NCAA tournament record that were set in the 2000 tournament that still stands.

Total attacks in NCAA tournament (team record) - Wisconsin, 1019 (56 vs. Bucknell, 178 vs. UNI, 182 vs. Kansas State, 260 vs. UCLA, 152 vs. Southern California, 191 vs. Nebraska).
Total digs, tournament (team record) - Wisconsin, 200 (26 vs. Bucknell, 72 vs. UNI, 71 vs. Kansas State, 99 vs. UCLA, 67 vs. Southern California, 75 vs. Nebraska).
Hitting percentage, tournament (individual record - min. 75 attempts) - .564%, Marissa Dalee, University of Arizona (.588 vs. Alabama A&M, .667 vs. Michigan, .294 vs. BYU, .654 vs. Nebraska).

References

NCAA Women's Volleyball Championship
NCAA
Sports in Richmond, Virginia
2000 in sports in Virginia
Volleyball in Virginia
December 2000 sports events in the United States
Sports competitions in Virginia